Jim Buchanan (22 July 1955 – 7 June 1977) was a Canadian athlete. He competed in the men's long jump at the 1976 Summer Olympics.

References

1955 births
1977 deaths
Athletes (track and field) at the 1976 Summer Olympics
Canadian male long jumpers
Olympic track and field athletes of Canada
Athletes from Ottawa